Zhinvali is a townlet in Georgia, Dusheti Municipality (Mtskheta-Mtianeti region), on river Aragvi.
It has one of the largest hydroelectric power stations in Georgia.

Climate

See also
 Aragvi Dam
 Mtskheta-Mtianeti

References 

Cities and towns in Mtskheta-Mtianeti
Tiflis Governorate